Lance William Niekro (born January 29, 1979) is a baseball coach and former first baseman, who is the current head baseball coach of the Florida Southern Moccasins. He played college baseball at Florida Southern for coach Chuck Anderson from 1999 to 2000 and then played four seasons in Major League Baseball (MLB) from 2003 to 2007. After his playing career concluded, he served as an assistant coach at Florida Southern and then was elevated to the head coach position on May 9, 2012. He is the son of MLB pitcher Joe Niekro and nephew of MLB pitcher Phil Niekro.

Career

High School and College
Born in Winter Haven, Florida, Niekro graduated from George W. Jenkins High School in Lakeland, Florida, and attended Florida Southern College. While in high school, he had transitioned from being a knuckleball pitcher to a position player, playing third base at Florida Southern. In 1999 and 2000, he played collegiate summer baseball for the Orleans Cardinals of the Cape Cod Baseball League (CCBL), and was named league MVP in 1999. He was inducted into the CCBL Hall of Fame in 2006.

San Francisco Giants
Niekro was selected by the San Francisco Giants in the second round of the 2000 Major League Baseball draft. He began his professional career as a third baseman, but moved to first base in the minor leagues due to injury.

Following the 2005 season, Snow and the Giants parted ways. As a result, Niekro was given his shot as the everyday first baseman, but was sent back down to the minors. During the  season, his replacements were Mark Sweeney, Travis Ishikawa, Chad Santos and Shea Hillenbrand.

On May 4, the Giants designated Niekro for assignment and recalled Scott Munter from Triple-A Fresno. He was later optioned to Fresno when no other team claimed him. He became a free agent after the season. Like his father and uncle, Niekro can throw a knuckleball, and was first allowed to pitch professionally for the Grizzlies in August 2007.

Houston Astros
On January 10, the Houston Astros signed Niekro to a minor league contract with an invitation to spring training. He was released on May 2, 2008 and retired, getting a job with a telecommunications company.

Atlanta Braves
On December 18, 2008, Niekro decided to make a comeback as a knuckleball pitcher and was signed by the Atlanta Braves to a minor league contract. He pitched one season in the Braves' system, appearing in 14 games for the Gulf Coast League Braves in  before becoming a free agent at the end of the year.

Coaching career
In , Niekro was named an assistant coach at Florida Southern. On May 9, 2012, Niekro succeeded Pete Meyer as the head coach of the Florida Southern Moccasins, a program that has produced the most NCAA Championships in Division II play (9).

See also
List of second-generation Major League Baseball players

References

External links

Lance Niekro Stats at RotoWire.com

1979 births
Living people
Florida Southern Moccasins baseball players
Orleans Firebirds players
Major League Baseball first basemen
Baseball players from Florida
San Francisco Giants players
San Jose Giants players
Fresno Grizzlies players
Round Rock Express players
Salem-Keizer Volcanoes players
Knuckleball pitchers
George W. Jenkins High School alumni
American people of Polish descent
Sportspeople from Lakeland, Florida
Florida Southern Moccasins baseball coaches
Gulf Coast Braves players
Grand Canyon Rafters players
Shreveport Swamp Dragons players